Marian Zdziechowski (30 April 1861, Nowosiółki, Minsk Governorate – 5 October 1938, Wilno) was a Polish philosopher, Slavist, publicist and cultural historian. He was a critic of fascist and communist totalitarianism, and was considered a representative of catastrophism and philosophical pessimism. He was a brother of the writer Kazimierz Zdziechowski.

At Jagiellonian University he became a lecturer in 1888 and a professor in 1899, followed by being a professor at Stefan Batory University from 1919 to 1931, with a rectorship from 1925 to 1927 and 1925–1927. He became a member of the Academy of Learning in 102. Honoris causa in universities of Vilno, Tartu and Szeged.

His area of study was historical, literary, philosophical and religious problems. He was an initiator of Slavic Club in Kraków which was active from 1901 to 1914 and periodical Świat Słowiański (Slavic World) published in the years of 1905–1914. Zdziechowski propagated the idea of co-operation between all of Slavs. He was interested mainly in the problem of evil, modernism in Roman Catholic Church, ideology of Romanticism, and crisis of European culture, in which he indicated fascism and communism as a dangerous. He referred to thoughts of Vladimir Solovyov, Leo Tolstoy, Nikolai Berdyaev and Dmitry Merezhkovsky.

Notable works
 Mesjaniści i słowianofile (1888)
 Byron i jego wiek (vol. 1–2, 1894–1897)
 Pestis perniciosissima (1905)
 Wizja Krasińskiego (1912)
 U opoki mesjanizmu (1912)
 Pesymizm, romantyzm a podstawy chrześcijaństwa (1914)
 Zygmunt Miłkowski a idea słowiańska w Polsce (1915)
 Gloryfikacja pracy (1916)
 Wpływy rosyjskie na duszę polską (1920)
 Renesans a rewolucja (1925)
 Walka o duszę młodzieży (1927)
  "O okrucieństwie"
 Niemcy. Szkic psychologiczny (1935)
 Węgry i Polska na przełomie historii (1937)
 Terror intelektualny w Rosji (1937)
 W obliczu końca (1937)
 Widmo przyszłości (1939) – published posthumously

References

External links
 

1861 births
1938 deaths
Burials at Antakalnis Cemetery
Cultural historians
Academic staff of Jagiellonian University
People from Minsky Uyezd
People from Valozhyn District
Philosophers of history
Philosophers of pessimism
Polish anti-communists
Polish anti-fascists
Polish male non-fiction writers
Polish philologists
19th-century Polish philosophers
Polish publicists
Rectors of Vilnius University

Polish messianism